The fourth season of the Brazilian competitive reality television series MasterChef premiered on March 7, 2017 at 10:30 p.m. on Band.

The show celebrated its 100th episode (including MasterChef Junior, the christmas's special MasterChef: O Desafio das Temporadas and MasterChef Profissionais) on Tuesday, July 11, 2017, during week 19.

The grand prize was R$200.000 (an increase over the first three seasons), a scholarship on Le Cordon Bleu in Paris, France, a year's supply on Carrefour worth R$1.000 per month, a Tramontina kit of pots, knives, barbecue and small home appliances by Breville and the MasterChef trophy. A scholarship on Le Cordon Bleu in Ottawa, Canada and a year's supply on Carrefour worth R$1.000 per month was awarded to the runner-up.

Commercial manager Michele Crispim won the competition over administrator Deborah Werneck on August 22, 2017. This was the second season of MasterChef Brasil to featured an all female final two, with Michele also being the first afro-brazilian contestant to win the show.

Contestants

Top 21

Elimination table

: Deborah won the Mystery Box challenge and advanced directly to next week, alongside Valter and Victor V. who were the challenge's top entries. Fabrizio, Fernando and Mirian were selected as the bottom entries and were not eligible to compete in the mini-challenge where the winner would guarantee immunity. Aderlize won the challenge and also advanced, leaving nine contestants to compete in the Elimination Test.
: Vitor B. won the Mystery Box challenge and advanced directly to next week, alongside Ana Luiza, Leonardo and Victor V. who were the challenge's top entries. Elimination Test's first round winner Mirian and top entries Fabrizio, Michele and Valter also advanced, leaving Aderlize, Deborah and Yuko in the bottom three. Deborah won the second and final round, while Yuko was eliminated over Aderlize.
: Fabrizio won the first round of the Pressure Test and advanced directly to next week, alongside Mirian and Victor V. who were the challenge's top entries, leaving Aderlize, Leornardo and Valter in the bottom three. Leornardo won the second and final round, while Aderlize was eliminated over Valter.
Key

Ratings and reception

Brazilian ratings
All numbers are in points and provided by Kantar Ibope Media.

 In 2017, each point represents 245.700 households in 15 market cities in Brazil (70.500 households in São Paulo only)
Note: Episode 4 aired against the Brazil vs. Paraguay football match for the 2018 FIFA World Cup qualification.

References

External links
 MasterChef on Band
 

2017 Brazilian television seasons
MasterChef (Brazilian TV series)